KarTrak, sometimes KarTrak ACI (Automatic Car Identification) is a colored barcode system designed to automatically identify railcars and other rolling stock. KarTrak was made a requirement in North America, but technical problems led to the abandonment of the system in the late 1970s.

History
In the late 1960s, railroads in North America began searching for a system that would allow them to automatically identify railcars and other rolling stock. Through the efforts of the Association of American Railroads (AAR), a number of companies developed automatic equipment identification (AEI) systems. The AAR selected four systems for extensive field tests. General Electric developed an RFID system, ABEX a microwave system, Wabco a black-and-white barcode system, and General Telephone & Electronics (GTE) a color barcode system called KarTrak. All those systems, except the RFID system, had labels that were mounted on each side of the railcar, and a trackside scanner.

After the initial field tests, the ABEX, Wabco, and GTE KarTrak ACI systems were selected for a head-to-head accuracy test on the Pennsylvania Railroad, at Spruce Creek, Pennsylvania. The KarTrak system was declared the winner and selected by the AAR as the standard.

Starting in 1967, all railcar owners were required by the AAR to install ACI labels on their cars. This requirement led to full-scale implementation of the ACI system in the early 1970s. By 1975, 90% of all railcars were labeled. The read rate was about 80%, which means that after seven years of service, 10% of the labels had failed for reasons such as physical damage and dirt accumulation. The dirt accumulation was most evident on flatcars that had low-mounted labels.

The AAR had recognized from their field tests that periodic inspection and label maintenance would be requirements to maintain a high level of label readability. Regulations were instituted for label inspection and repair whenever a railcar was in the repair shop, which on average happened every two years. The maintenance program never gained sufficient compliance. Without maintenance, the read rate failed to improve, and the KarTrak system was abandoned by 1977. Because of this failure, the railroad industry did not seriously search for another system to identify railcars until the mid-1980s.

Design

Tags and label design

KarTrak ACI tags consisted of a plate with 13 horizontal labels put in a vertical arrangement that are also understood as data lines, which could have 13 different forms. These labels, or symbols, stand for the single digits 0-9, the number 10 as an extra feature for the checksum line, and the "START" and "STOP" labels that gave reference to the vertical line position of the tag. Present day available depictions of the labels do often name the upper color first and then the lower color.

In practice people found that there was a significant number of cases where the label set was not done correctly or the label application had errors such as a 180° rotation of it - whilst as a rule of thumbs the blue stripes of START and STOP would have been needed to point to the left with a to-the-middle-of-the-tag orientation. Especially the color selection and sequence ordering of STOP seems to be the subject of such errors leading to decoding errors and needs for decoder workarounds for the field that effectively weakened the system. Even some early times advertisement materials exposed such flaws. Also its said that checksum labels had been wrong sometimes, and even the label set itself had some variations in respect to the imprinted number.

- = not used / reserved
white = white/black checker pattern aka checkered

The labels, also understood as data lines, each had two horizontal stripes that together represented a single symbol of information. The used colors for the stripes were blue, white, red and black. This does make up a total of 16 combinations where only 12 were used in the center area by just excluding black to be the lower color. For sensor reasons the white color was dimmed down by a black checkerboard so that they roughly met with the intensity of red and blue that were light sensed via a color filters.

Labels could be affixed directly to the car side, but usually were applied to dark plates, which were then riveted to each side of the car.

The labels were made from retroreflective plastic sheet that was coated with red or blue dye to provide distinguishable color filters. The retroreflective material gave a clear optical signal that could be read from a  distance and easily distinguished from the other markings on the railcar. The white areas provided both a red and blue optical response to the reader, and were patterned with dots so that their brightness would be about the same as a red or blue stripe.

The start and stop labels were partially filled, so that the reader scanning beam would be centered on them before they were recognized. This ensured that the entire label was centered and had the best chance of being read accurately.

Data contained in Label Lines

The labels are to be read from bottom to top:

 Line 13: check digit.
 Line 12: stop label.
 Lines 6 to 11: car number.
 Lines 2 to 5: equipment/owner code.
 Line 2: equipment code
 Lines 3 to 5: ownership code
 Line 1: start label.

The first digit of the equipment owner (line 2) marks the type of equipment: 0 for railroad-owned, 1 for privately-owned, or 6 for non-revenue equipment.

The car number is left-padded with zeroes if necessary. For locomotives, line 6 is the type of unit and line 7 the suffix number.

The check digit is calculated as follows: Each number digit is multiplied by two to the power of the labels's position minus two. Thus, the first digit (line 2) is multiplied by 1, the second by 2, the third by 4, the fourth by 8 and so on, until the 10th, which is multiplied by 512. The sum of all these numbers modulo is the check digit.

The code on the caboose in the picture at top can be decoded as Start 8350199918 Stop 5. This means a car with equipment code number 8, ownership code 350, which lists this as a car of the Illinois Central Railroad, car number 199918, with a check digit of 5.

Trackside scanners

The readers were optical scanners, somewhat like the barcode scanners used for grocery barcode items today. The scanning distances and speeds meant that the processing electronics needed to be state-of-the-art for its day. They were placed along the rail lines, often at the entrance and exit of a switchyard, spaced back from the tracks so that the labels would pass in the reading zone,  from the scanner.

The scanners were housed in metal boxes about the size of a mini-refrigerator. They consisted of a collimated 100-200 watt xenon arc light source arranged co-axially with red and blue sensing photo tubes. The coaxial optical arrangement provided optimum sensing of the retroreflective labels. This optical source and sensing beam was directed to a large mirrored rotating wheel that provided the vertical scanning of the railcar. The movement of the train provided the horizontal scanning.

The scanner's analog video signals were passed to a nearby rail equipment hut where the processing and computing electronics were located. The first systems were discrete circuits and logic and only provided an ASCII-coded list of the labels that passed the scanner. These were forwarded to the rail operators for manual tracking or integration with their computer systems. Later reading systems were coupled with era minicomputers (Digital Equipment Corporation PDP-8s), and more elaborate tracking and weighing systems were integrated. Sometimes these included many railyard input sensors, for rail switch position, car passage, and hot wheel bearing sensors. Some of the more productive and thus longer-lived systems were installed in captive rail applications that carried bulk goods from mines to smelter, where the weight of individual cars loaded and unloaded tracked the bulk inventory.

Legacy
The KarTrak system proved to need too much maintenance to be practical. Up to 20% of the cars were not read correctly. This led to the abandonment of the system in the late 1970s. Its place was eventually taken by the RFID-based approach. Between 1967 and 1977, the railroad industry spent $150 million on KarTrak, and up to 95% of cars were barcoded.

Older cars can often still be seen with a KarTrak label.

KarTrak label decals are readily available for different model railroad scales.

References

Information systems
Rail technologies